Silvio Schröter (born 29 June 1979) is a German professional footballer who played as a midfielder.

Career
Born in Radebeul, Schröter began his career at his hometown club TSV 1862 Radeburg, before joining the youth ranks of Dynamo Dresden. He moved up to the senior squad in 1997 of the Regionalliga North-East side, gradually progressing within the club to being an almost ever-present in his final season.

He was then snapped up by newly promoted Bundesliga side Energie Cottbus in summer 2001. His Bundesliga debut came on 1 December 2001 in a 1–0 defeat at TSV 1860 Munich. Three games later, he scored what proved to be his sole goal for the club in a 5–2 defeat at Hamburger SV. Although the club managed to survive its first year at the top level, the following season saw the club finishing bottom.

This relegation was the cue for Schröter to move on as he agreed to join Hannover 96, signing a three-year deal in July 2003. Although, he was unable to make his Hannover debut until December due to a torn cruciate ligament from the previous April, he became a familiar face in the team after this. Injuries have often curtailed the winger's subsequent seasons appearances too.

In January 2008, he moved to MSV Duisburg, but left after six months, joining FC Carl Zeiss Jena. He was released by Jena in June 2009.

Personal life
He was known as "Sille" at Hannover 96. He is married and has two children.

References

External links
 

1979 births
Living people
German footballers
Association football midfielders
Germany B international footballers
Bundesliga players
3. Liga players
Dynamo Dresden players
Dynamo Dresden II players
FC Energie Cottbus players
Hannover 96 players
MSV Duisburg players
FC Carl Zeiss Jena players
Footballers from Saxony